Deborah Lea "Debbie" Wilson (born 23 March 1961) is an Australian former cricketer who played primarily as a right-arm fast bowler. She appeared in 11 Test matches and 11 One Day Internationals for Australia between 1984 and 1991. She played domestic cricket for New South Wales and Western Australia.
 
Wilson's older sister, Bev, also played international cricket for Australia.

Wilson holds the record for the highest individual Test score by a woman cricketer when batting at number 9 position or lower in women's Test history, with 91*.

References

External links
 
 
 Debbie Wilson at southernstars.org.au

1961 births
Living people
Cricketers from Sydney
Australia women Test cricketers
Australia women One Day International cricketers
New South Wales Breakers cricketers
Western Australia women cricketers